This article lists the colonial governors of South West Africa. South West Africa was the colonial predecessor of the modern day Republic of Namibia from when the territory was controlled by the German Empire (as German South West Africa) and later by South Africa.

The title of the position changed a number of times. Under German rule, the title of the position went from Commissioner (1884–1893) to Provincial Governor (1893–1898) to Governor (1898–1915). Under South African rule, the title was Administrator (1915–1977) and Administrator-General (1977–1990).

After the United Nations terminated South Africa's mandate to govern South West Africa, the UN appointed commissioners of its own. They had no authority and South Africa refused to recognize them, and are not included here.

List
 Dates in italics indicate de facto continuation of office

German South West Africa

South West Africa

See also
United Nations Commissioner for Namibia
Namibia
Politics of Namibia
President of Namibia
Vice-President of Namibia
Prime Minister of Namibia
Transitional Government of National Unity (Namibia)
Walvis Bay
List of colonial governors of Walvis Bay
Lists of office-holders

External links
World Statesmen – Namibia

History of Namibia
South West Africa
German South West Africa
Politics of South Africa
Colonial
South West Africa